The 1991 Island Games were the fourth Island Games, and were held in Åland, from June 23 to June 29, 1991.

Medal table

Sports
The sports chosen for the games were:

External links
 1991 Island Games

Island Games
Sport in Åland
1991 in multi-sport events
Multi-sport events in Finland
June 1991 sports events in Europe
1991 in Finnish sport